Kubatbek Ayilchiyevich Boronov (Qubatbek Ayılçiyeviç Boronov; born 15 December 1964) is a Kyrgyz politician who served as the Prime Minister of Kyrgyzstan from 17 June 2020 to 6 October 2020.

Prior to being named prime minister Boronov had served as First Deputy Prime Minister from April 2018. He has also served as the Minister of Emergency Situations from 2011 to 2018.

Likely due to pressure from the ongoing 2020 Kyrgyzstani protests, Boronov resigned from his position as prime minister, citing parliamentary deputy Myktybek Abdyldayev as the new speaker. On October 9, President Sooronbay Jeenbekov accepted Boronov's resignation.

References

1964 births
Living people
People from Osh Region
Prime Ministers of Kyrgyzstan